Ohakune is a small town at the southern end of Tongariro National Park, close to the southwestern slopes of the active volcano Mount Ruapehu, in the North Island of New Zealand.

A rural service town known as New Zealand's Carrot Capital, Ohakune is a popular base in winter for skiers using the ski fields (particularly Turoa) of Mount Ruapehu and in summer for trampers hiking the Tongariro Alpine Crossing.

Toponymy
The Ngāti Rangi iwi say the Māori language name Ohakune comes from the phrase "he Ohakune ki te ao", which broadly means "an opening to a new world" and refers to the descent from Mount Ruapehu into the valley and swamps of the area. In 2019 the New Zealand Geographic Board changed the official name to Ōhakune, indicating that the first letter was a long vowel, but swiftly reverted to Ohakune without a macron when Ngāti Rangi objected.

History and culture

Pre-European history
The lands to the south and west of Mount Ruapehu were historically inhabited by the Māori of the Ngāti Rangi iwi. 

Around the middle of the seventeenth century a marae at Rangataua, a small town about five kilometres south-east of Ohakune, was attacked and the inhabitants were driven from their homes by raiders from the Ngāti Raukawa, an iwi from farther east in Manawatu. Around 75 of the village's population were slain and the dozen or so survivors fled to Maungarongo and established a pā on the present site of the town of Ohakune.

European settlement

The Crown purchased 10,000 acres of Native land at Ohakune in 1879.

In 1883, the first engineering reconnaissance commenced for the Marton—Te Awamutu section of the North Island Main Trunk Railway and a base was established upon the present site of Ohakune, and soon became a permanent camp for railway and road construction workers. Settlement of the town commenced in the early 1890s. Forty quarter-acre sections in the township were sold at auction in February 1983. Prior to the completion of the railway to the town, all supplies had to be transported via cart from Hunterville, or from Whanganui via the Whanganui River steamer to Pipiriki and then by cart for the remaining distance. 

By March 1908 the railway line had reached Ohakune. The period of railway construction activities was followed quickly by intensive timber milling; as the forest was cleared, cattle and sheep were introduced and farming progressed. Ohakune was constituted a town district in August 1908 and in November 1911 attained borough status.

Marae

Ohakune has two marae. Maungārongo Marae and Tikaraina Ringapoto or Ko Te Kingi o Te Maungārongo meeting house is a meeting place of the Ngāti Rangi hapū of Ngāti Tui-o-Nuku. Ngā Mōkai Marae and Whakarongo meeting house are a meeting place of the Ngāti Rangi hapū of Ngāti Tongaiti.

In October 2020, the Government committed $836,930 from the Provincial Growth Fund to upgrade a cluster of 7 marae, including Maungārongo Marae, creating 95 jobs.

Geography

Setting 
Ohakune is located in the Ruapehu District and the Manawatū-Whanganui region, to the immediate south-west of the slopes of the Mount Ruapehu stratovolcano.

Climate

Demographics

There were 450 households. There were 621 males and 561 females, giving a sex ratio of 1.11 males per female. The median age was 36.1 years (compared with 37.4 years nationally), with 225 people (19.0%) aged under 15 years, 246 (20.8%) aged 15 to 29, 555 (47.0%) aged 30 to 64, and 150 (12.7%) aged 65 or older.

Ethnicities were 69.8% European/Pākehā, 34.8% Māori, 2.3% Pacific peoples, 7.9% Asian, and 3.3% other ethnicities (totals add to more than 100% since people could identify with multiple ethnicities).

The proportion of people born overseas was 18.5%, compared with 27.1% nationally.

Although some people objected to giving their religion, 53.6% had no religion, 29.2% were Christian, 2.3% were Hindu, 0.3% were Muslim, 0.5% were Buddhist and 7.1% had other religions.

Of those at least 15 years old, 168 (17.6%) people had a bachelor or higher degree, and 162 (16.9%) people had no formal qualifications. The median income was $31,100, compared with $31,800 nationally. The employment status of those at least 15 was that 528 (55.2%) people were employed full-time, 144 (15.0%) were part-time, and 39 (4.1%) were unemployed.

Economy
In the year to March 2021, the GDP of Ohakune was $74m, representing approximately 10% of the GDP for the Ruapehu District as a whole. The economy of the town is largely based on services. The largest categories of GDP were retail trade (15.8%), arts and recreation services (14%), accommodation and food services (10.9%) and owner-occupied property operation (9.1%). In the same period there were 781 filled jobs, with 22.5% of these in retail trade, 19.9% in accommodation and food services, and 14.3% in arts and recreation services.

Facilities
Ohakune has facilities for snow sports, trout fishing, mountain biking, tramping and bushwalking.

Landmarks

On the eastern edge of the town there is a large replica of a carrot, known as "The Big Carrot". This is reputedly the world's largest model carrot, and was originally constructed as a prop for a television advertisement for the ANZ Bank in the early 1980s. After filming was complete, the carrot was donated to the town in recognition of the area's reputation as the source of a high proportion of New Zealand's carrots, and installed in its current position in 1984.

In the 1980s and '90s Ohakune was home to the Weather Rock, a local landmark in Thames Street popular with tourists for photographs; the rock used to "forecast" current weather conditions with a sign listing sayings such as "If rock is hot – sunny", "If rock is wet – raining", etc., and appropriately for the region, "If rock is bouncing – earthquake". The site is currently vacant.

The world's first commercial bungee jumping site was established just outside Ohakune at the old railway viaduct.  This was operated during the 1980s until the bridge became too unsafe to continue operations.  This bridge is now restored and a highlight of the 'Old Coach Road' walk/bikeway.

Ohakune railway station has the second highest elevation of any operating railway station in New Zealand behind National Park Railway Station; a sign on the platform side of the station building lists its height at 2,029 feet (618.4 metres) above sea level.

Health and welfare

In 2015 Ohakune had a dental clinic, pharmacy, fire station, police station, ambulance station, social welfare branch, churches, a marae with a district nurse, gymnasium, and a health shuttle for outpatient care at Whanganui Hospital 110 km away.

The nearest medical centre with GP, nurses and physiotherapist is 11 km to the west, at Raetihi.

Shopping and services
Ohakune has the usual range of shops and services found within a typical small New Zealand town.

Sporting clubs
Ohakune has a number of clubs and is home to the Ruapehu Rugby & Sports Club.

Media 
Ohakune is covered by the Whanganui Chronicle, a daily paper part of the NZ Herald network. Ski FM Network operates out of Ohakune hosted by 91.8 FM Ruapehu/Turoa, a Central North Island radio station. During the winter it operates as an "information desk" for information about the snow levels for the region.

Activities and events

Winter activities
Ohakune provides easy access to the nearby ski fields of Mount Ruapehu; the large commercials ski resorts of Turoa (the closest resort to Ohakune) and Whakapapa, and well as the small club field Tukino. Various outlets for clothing and ski hire, as well as purchasing lift tickets, are available in the town.

Summer activities
Ohakune caters for various summer activities, and provides access for trampers hiking the Tongariro Alpine Crossing. Mountain bikes are available for hire at various outlets in town.

Various water activities are available on the nearby rivers, with jet boating on the Whanganui River and rafting available along the Whanganui, Rangitikei and Tongariro rivers. Trout fishing is available in nearby lakes and rivers, including the world-famous Tongariro River.  Activities can be booked at the Ruapehu i-SITE.

The Bridge to Nowhere in the Whanganui National Park located between Okakune and Whanganui is a popular destination for trampers and mountain bikers.

Events
In recent years the number of events hosted by Ohakune has increased, with both the Big Mountain Short Film Festival and Ohakune Mardi Gras featuring on the calendar. The Mardi Gras is both a ski party and celebration of winter, and includes musicians, stalls and rides.

Education
Ohakune has three schools.

Ohakune School is a state full primary (Year 1–8) school. It has  students as of 
Ruapehu College is a state secondary (Year 9–13) school. It has  students as of 
Te Kura Kaupapa Māori o Ngati Rangi is a state Kura Kaupapa Māori, offering a full primary (Year 1–8) education. It has  students as of

Transportation

Road 
State Highway 49 runs through the town, where it is locally named Clyde Street.

Ohakune is on the Intercity coach network, with a non-daily service running north to Auckland via Taumarunui and south to Palmerston North via Whanganui.

Rail

Ohakune is on the North Island Main Trunk Railway. The railway station is located off Thames Street in the Ohakune Junction area, approximately 2.5 kilometres from Clyde Street in the centre of town. , no scheduled passenger services currently serve Ohakune. 

Passenger services were previously provided by the national operator KiwiRail. The Northern Explorer was a non-daily service operating between Auckland and Wellington until its discontinuation in December 2021. The journey to/from Auckland crossed the famous Raurimu Spiral.

From 18 December 1917 until 1 January 1968, Ohakune was also the junction for the Raetihi Branch, a branch line railway to Raetihi. A truss bridge formerly used by this branch still stands near the Big Carrot. Seventeen kilometres to the east of the town is the Tangiwai Bridge, site of New Zealand's worst railway accident, the Tangiwai Disaster, on 24 December 1953.

Popular culture
A mock-romantic song from the mid-1960s called September in Ohakune was recorded by Peter Harcourt on an LP called Land of the Long White Shroud.

Notable people
Notable people from, or significantly connected with, Ohakune include:
 Erwin Leonard Guy Abel – grocer, businessman, athlete and racehorse owner
 Jeff Bollow – co-founder of the Big Mountain Short Film Festival
 Martin Edmond – author and screenplay writer
 Pat Mackie – miner and unionist, born 30 October 1914 as Maurice Patrick Murphy, birth registered in Ohakune
 Mick Moohan – member of the Ohakune Borough Council from 1932 to 1935, also serving as deputy mayor; later Labour Party MP, President, and Minister
 William Taylor – primary school principal, Mayor of Ohakune, and writer
 Peter Williams – barrister, Queen's Counsel and penal reform advocate

References

External links

 Ohakune at Visit Ruapehu

Populated places in Manawatū-Whanganui
Ruapehu District